Have You Lived Before This Life is a non-fiction book published by L. Ron Hubbard in 1958. It was one of the canonical texts of Scientology,
 
The book was Hubbard's response to the success of the Bridey Murphy phenomenon in the UK. Hubbard saw this as an opportunity to increase public interest in past life regression.

It purports to be a collection of "forty-one actual case histories" of reincarnation and past-life experiences, gleaned from auditing with an e-meter at the Church of Scientology's "Fifth London Advanced Clinical Course" held in October-November, 1958. Some of these "case histories" took place on other worlds or in the extremely distant past. The book was based on an earlier privately printed softcover circulation made available to students who attended that course.

Scientology's official website says of the book: "The major portion of the book is devoted to the auditing case histories of individuals, detailing their memories of past lives. These case histories graphically show how a person’s attitudes and actions in present time can be affected by incidents in his or her past lifetimes. They also document the improvements that occurred when such incidents were addressed and run out in auditing."

Reception
In her book The Scandal of Scientology, Paulette Cooper examined the often fantastical nature of the past lives described, referred to by Hubbard as "space opera":

"Hubbard has devoted a special book called Have You Lived Before This Life: A Scientific Survey just to past-life case histories of Scientologists. The preface of this book also contains the names and addresses of the people who took part in the experiment so that the cynical could check its facts ... Most of the Scientologists who relived their past lives believed that they had once been plain people, or very often space people, and for plots, their histories read like a type of science-fiction sadomasochism."

Unpublished sequel
According to Cooper, Hubbard announced a sequel called Where Were You Buried? was in the works. He instructed his auditors to check all preclears for recent deaths, and then to physically locate their place of burial.

See also
Scientology bibliography
Scientology beliefs and practices

References

External links
New Era Publications: 
Scientology Library: Have You Lived Before This Life? 

1958 fiction books
Books published by the Church of Scientology
Books about reincarnation